Kristin Patzwahl (born 16 July 1965 in Leipzig) is a retired German hurdler.

She represented the sports clubs SC DHFK Leipzig and LAC Halensee Berlin, and became German champion in 1991, 1993 and 1994. Her personal best time was 12.80 seconds, achieved in June 1990 in Chemnitz.

Achievements

References

1965 births
Living people
German female hurdlers
Athletes (track and field) at the 1992 Summer Olympics
Athletes (track and field) at the 1996 Summer Olympics
Olympic athletes of Germany
Athletes from Leipzig